374th may refer to:

374th Airlift Wing, unit of the United States Air Force assigned to Fifth Air Force, stationed at Yokota Air Base, Japan
374th Fighter Squadron or 171st Air Refueling Squadron, unit of the Michigan Air National Guard's 127th Wing (127 WG) located at Selfridge Air National Guard Base, Michigan
374th Operations Group, the operational flying component of the United States Air Force 374th Airlift Wing
374th Strategic Missile Squadron, inactive United States Air Force unit, last assigned to the 308th Strategic Missile Wing, stationed at Little Rock AFB, Arkansas

See also
374 (number)
374, the year 374 (CCCLXXIV) of the Julian calendar
374 BC